Jimmy Modeste (born 8 July 1981 in Paris, France) is a Cape Verdean former professional football defender who works as assistant manager at French third tier Red Star FC, after having held the same position at amateur clubs L'Entente SSG and Noisy-le-Grand FC simultaneously.

Coaching career
In January 2019, the two clubs where Modeste held the assistant manager role both knocked out professional opposition in the ninth round of the Coupe de France on consecutive days. L'Entente SSG beat Ligue 1 side Montpellier HSC on 5 January and Noisy-le-Grand FC beat Ligue 2 side Gazélec Ajaccio on 6 January.

He followed ESSG manager Vincent Bordot to Red Star FC in the summer of 2019, keeping an assistant manager role.

References

External links
 
 
 lequipe
 
 
 

1981 births
Living people
Footballers from Paris
Citizens of Cape Verde through descent
Cape Verdean footballers
French footballers
Association football defenders
Cape Verde international footballers
French sportspeople of Cape Verdean descent
Ligue 2 players
Championnat National players
Championnat National 2 players
Czech First League players
Cypriot First Division players
Paris FC players
Le Mans FC players
Stade Brestois 29 players
Chamois Niortais F.C. players
FK Bohemians Prague (Střížkov) players
AEP Paphos FC players
Nea Salamis Famagusta FC players
A.O. Glyfada players
FCM Aubervilliers players
Expatriate footballers in the Czech Republic
Expatriate footballers in Cyprus
Expatriate footballers in Greece
Cape Verdean people of French descent